Nicholas Larionow (born 28 June 1980)  is a paralympic athlete from Australia competing mainly in category F36 discus and shot put events. He was born in Melbourne, Victoria.

Nicholas competed in the 2004 Summer Paralympics in the discus and shot put, finishing third in the shot put.

References

External links
 

1980 births
Living people
Paralympic athletes of Australia
Paralympic bronze medalists for Australia
Paralympic medalists in athletics (track and field)
Athletes (track and field) at the 2004 Summer Paralympics
Medalists at the 2004 Summer Paralympics
Australian male discus throwers
Australian male shot putters